This is a list of tectonic plates on Earth's surface. Tectonic plates are pieces of Earth's crust and uppermost mantle, together referred to as the lithosphere. The composition of the two types of crust differs markedly, with  mafic basaltic rocks dominating oceanic crust, while continental crust consists principally of lower-density felsic granitic rocks.

Current plates

Geologists generally agree that the following tectonic plates currently exist on Earth's surface with roughly definable boundaries. Tectonic plates are sometimes subdivided into three fairly arbitrary categories: major (or primary) plates, minor (or secondary) plates, and microplates (or tertiary plates).

Major plates
These plates comprise the bulk of the continents and the Pacific Ocean. For purposes of this list, a major plate is any plate with an area greater than 20 million km2.

  – 61,300,000 km2
  – 60,900,000 km2
  – 67,800,000 km2
  (sometimes considered to be two separate tectonic plates) – 58,900,000 km2
  – 47,000,000 km2
  – 11,900,000 km2
  – 75,900,000 km2
  – 103,300,000 km2
  – 43,600,000 km2

Minor plates
These smaller plates are often not shown on major plate maps, as the majority of them do not comprise significant land area. For purposes of this list, a minor plate is any plate with an area less than 20 million km2 but greater than 1 million km2.

 
  – 5,000,000 km2
  – 1,100,000 km2
  – 3,300,000 km2
  – 1,700,000 km2
  – 2,900,000 km2
  – 11,900,000 km2
  – 15,600,000 km2
  – 1,100,000 km2
 
  – 5,500,000 km2
  – 1,600,000 km2
  – 16,700,000 km2

Microplates
These plates are often grouped with an adjacent principal plate on a tectonic plate world map. For purposes of this list, a microplate is any plate with an area less than 1 million km2. Some models identify more minor plates within current orogens (events that lead to a large structural deformation of Earth's lithosphere) like the Apulian, Explorer, Gorda, and Philippine Mobile Belt plates. New research can change the scientific consensus as to whether such plates should be considered distinct portions of the crust.

 African Plate
 
 
 
 

 Antarctic Plate
 
 
 
 

 Australian Plate
 
 
 
 
 
 
 

 Caribbean Plate
 
 
 
 
 

 Cocos Plate
 

 Eurasian Plate
 
 
  
 
 
 
 
 
 
 
 
 
 

 Nazca Plate
 
 

 North American Plate
 
 
 
 

 Pacific Plate
 
 
 
 
 
  – 250,000 km2
 
 
 
 
 
 
 

 Philippine Sea Plate
 
 

 Scotia Plate
 

 Somali Plate
 
 

 South American Plate
 
 
  (mainly in Colombia, minor parts in Ecuador and Venezuela)
  (Eastern Caribbean Region)
  (Andean Region)
  (Central Andean Region)

Ancient continental formations
In the history of Earth many tectonic plates have come into existence and have over the intervening years either accreted onto other plates to form larger plates, rifted into smaller plates, or have been crushed by or subducted under other plates.

Ancient supercontinents 

 
The following list includes the supercontinents known or speculated to have existed in the Earth's past:

Ancient plates and cratons 
Not all plate boundaries are easily defined, especially for ancient pieces of crust. The following list of ancient cratons, microplates, plates, shields, terranes, and zones no longer exist as separate plates. Cratons are the oldest and most stable parts of the continental lithosphere and shields are the exposed area of a craton(s). Microplates are tiny tectonic plates, terranes are fragments of crustal material formed on one tectonic plate and accreted to crust lying on another plate, and zones are bands of similar rocks on a plate formed by terrane accretion or native rock formation. Terranes may or may not have originated as independent microplates: a terrane may not contain the full thickness of the lithosphere.

African Plate 
 
  (Zambia)
  (Angola, Cameroon, Central African Republic, Democratic Republic of Congo, Gabon, Sudan, and Zambia)
  (South Africa)
  (South Africa)
  (Algeria)
  (Zimbabwe)
  (Tanzania)
  (Algeria, Benin, Burkina Faso, Côte d'Ivoire, Gambia, Ghana, Guinea, Guinea Bissau, Liberia, Mali, Mauritania, Morocco, Nigeria, Senegal, Sierra Leone, and Togo)
 Zaire Craton (Congo)
  (Zimbabwe)

Antarctic Plate

Eurasian Plate 
  (France, Germany, Spain and Portugal)
  (Canada, Great Britain, and United States)
 
 Belomorian Craton
 Central Iberian Plate
  (Anatolia, Iran, Afghanistan, Tibet, Indochina and Malaya)
 East China Craton
 
 
  and Eastern Kazakhstan
 
 
  and the Junngar Basin in China 
 
 
 
 
 Moravo Silesian Plate
 
 
 
 Ossa-Morena Plate
 
 Proto-Alps Terrane
 
 
 
 
 South Portuguese Plate
 Tarim Craton
 Teplá-Barrandian Terrane
 
 
 Volgo-Uralian Craton
 Yakutai Craton

Indo-Australian Plate 

 Altjawarra Craton (Australia)
 Bhandara Craton, (India)
 Bundelkhand Craton, (India)
 
 Central Craton (Australia)
 Curnamona Craton (Australia)
 
 
 
 
 Singhbhum Craton (India)
 
 
 . See Moa Plate and Lord Howe Rise

North American Plate 

  (Canada, Great Britain, and United States)
 
  (Canada)
  (split into the Cocos, Explorer, Juan de Fuca, Gorda Plates, Nazca Plate, and Rivera Plates)
  (United States)
  (Canada)
  (Canada and United States)
 
 
 
 Mexican Plate
  (Canada)
 Newfoundland Plate 
 
 Nova Scotia Plate
  (Canada)
 Sask Craton (Canada)
  (Canada)
  (Canada)
  (Canada)
  (United States)

South American Plate 
  (Brazil)
  (Brazil, Colombia, French Guiana, Guyana, Suriname and Venezuela)
  (Argentina and Uruguay)
  (Brazil)
  (Argentina, Bolivia, Chile and Peru)

See also 

List of tectonic plate interactions – Types of plate boundaries

Notes and references

Notes

References

Bibliography 
North Andes Plate

External links 
 Bird, Peter (2003) An updated digital model of plate boundaries also available as a large (13 Mb) PDF file

Tectonic plates